The Men's 1 km time trial, Classes 1-3 track cycling event at the 2012 Summer Paralympics took place on 30 August at London Velopark.

Results
WR = World Record

References

Men's time trial C1-3